Plaza Monumental de Morelia (Monumental Plaza of Morelia in English), is a multi-purpose complex in Morelia, in the state of Michoacán, Mexico. The complex can seat up to 15,000 people, it can also accommodate concerts, sports venue and bullriding (jaripeo).

External links
 Plaza Monumental de Morelia Official Homepage

Morelia
Sports venues in Michoacán
Morelia